Santa Lucía Hill, also known in Mapuche as Huelén Hill, is a small hill in the centre of Santiago, Chile. It is situated between Alameda del Libertador Bernardo O'Higgins in the south, Santa Lucía Street in the west and Victoria Subercaseaux on the east. An adjacent metro station is named after it.  The hill has an altitude of 629 m and a height of 69 m over the surrounding area.  The hill is the remnant of a volcano 15 million years old.

The hill comprises a 65,300 square metre park adorned with ornate facades, stairways and fountains. At the highest point there is a viewpoint popular with tourists visiting the city and meeting point.

History
It was originally called Huelito o heutrecan by the pre-colonization inhabitants. However, the current name comes from the day in which Pedro de Valdivia conquered the hill, on December 13, 1540. That day celebrates "Santa Lucía."

Its first use by its missionaries was as a point of worship, or prayer in the years of the chicken pox outbreak (1541).

In 1816, Manuel Olaguer Feliú, the Brigadier of the Royal Engineers, designed and built two forts or castles on Santa Lucía Hill, one north and the other south of the hill. The forts were built out of stone and lime and could fit eight or twelve cannons each. Besides, Olaguer Feliú drew and built an outbuilding for ammunition depot and to house the garrison.

On one side of the hill, Fort Hidalgo was finished in 1820 as a defensive point. On the other side, the hillside terrain was used as a "cemetery for the dissidents", people who did not follow the then-official Roman Catholic faith, or were considered otherwise unworthy of burial at hallowed grounds. However, the remains buried in the hillside under this fashion were eventually transferred to a secluded section of the General Cemetery, before said cemetery, in turn, was opened to all burials regardless of creed or social condition.

In 1849 James Melville Gilliss led an American naval astronomical expedition to Chile in order to more precisely measure the solar parallax. An observatory was set up on Santa Lucía Hill and operated by Gilliss. When the expedition ended in September 1852 the observatory and related equipment was sold to the Chilean government and formed the nucleus of the first National Astronomical Observatory.

In 1872 Benjamín Vicuña Mackenna decided to conduct a dramatic change to the urban atmosphere of the city of Santiago, among his many works aimed to improve the city, and thus initiated an extensive remodelation of the hill.
The works of 1872 consisted of a road which crossed the hill, which at the top accessed a chapel which he also built there, illuminated by the then-novel means of gas. The rest of the hill contains a park with fountains and lookouts. The actual hill is watered by a sophisticated irrigation system. The now iconic yellow and white facade is also a product of Vicuña Mackenna's remodelation.

Vicuña Mackenna was assisted in realizing his designs by the architect Manuel Aldunate, the constructor Enrique Henes, and the stonecutter Andrés Staimbuck.

A few years ago, Santa Lucía hill received an improvement in its illumination system and protections. Also, Fort Hidalgo was restored and reopened to the public. Traditionally, a cannon shot is fired exactly at noon.

Curiosity

Located in Santa Lucía Hill there is a monument which consists of a 2 m high stone carved with a paragraph extracted from the text that Pedro de Valdivia sent to emperor Charles V describing the features of the new land conquered.

In popular culture
Santa Lucía Hill is one of the entrances to the abyss in the videogame Abyss Odyssey, the entrance is located in the east part of the Terraza Neptuno.

Santa Lucía Hill was featured on the second episode of The Amazing Race 7 with the competing teams finishing their leg in Santiago at Terraza Neptuno. The eighth season of the Israeli version of The Amazing Race also finished its sixth leg at Terraza Neptuno.

Inside Santa Lucía Hill

References

External links 

 The Singular Santiago, Lastarria Hotel
 View Panoramic 360° of Cerro Santa Lucía | Flip360

Geography of Santiago, Chile
Hills of Chile
Parks in Santiago, Chile
National Monuments of Chile
Landforms of Santiago Metropolitan Region